A&E is a pay-TV channel of A&E Networks, headquartered in Munich. A&E stands for Arts and Entertainment, which has been the title of A&E Network in America for many years. The channel broadcasts its full program in Germany, Austria and Switzerland. A&E is a registered trademark of The History Channel (Germany) GmbH & Co. KG. In the German-speaking world, the non-functional digital transmitter is operated in a joint venture between NBC Universal Global Networks Deutschland GmbH and A+E Networks.

A&E radiates reallife documentary around extraordinary protagonists. Crime, Deals, Family and Paranormal are the four core genres of the station. The program is compiled entirely by A+E Networks Germany and consists of synchronized productions of the American counterpart, broadcasts of the German program partner ZDF and other suppliers. The offer includes single items, weekly thematic content as well as series and series.

History
A&E replaced The Biography Channel on all dissemination channels on September 22, 2014 in the German-speaking market.

Programming

Attic Gold (Attic Gold - Das Glück liegt auf dem Dachboden) (2016–present)
Barry'd Treasure (Barry'd Treasure - Der Trödelexperte) (2014-2016)
Behind Bars: Rookie Year (Job im Knast - 60 Tage auf Bewährung) (2016–present)
Beyond Scared Straight (Vollzug auf Probe - Teenager hinter Gittern) (2014–present)
Brandi & Jarrod: Married to the Job (Brandi & Jarrod - Ein perfektes Team) (2015–present)
Celebrity Ghost Stories (Übersinnliche Begegnungen - Stars erzählen) (2014–present)
Cold Case Files (Cold Case Files - Wahre Fälle der US-Ermittler) (2017–present)
Diabolical Women (Weiblich, Clever, Kriminell) (2015–present)
Die Tierdocs (2016–present)
Don't Trust Andrew Mayne (Andrew Mayne - Alles Illusion) (2014-2015)
Duck Commander: Before the Dynasty (2015–present)
Duck Dynasty (2014–present)
Garage Gold (2015–present)
Hoarders (Leben im Chaos) (2014)
House of Love (2015–present)
House Rules (House Rules - Dein Haus, meine Baustelle) (2015–present)
I Escaped My Killer (2016–present)
Leah Remini: Scientology and the Aftermath (Leah Remini: Ein Leben nach Scientology) (2017–present)
Monster in My Family (Blutsverwandt - Der Mörder in der Familie) (2016–present)
Motive to Murder (2018–present)
My Crazy Ex (2015–present)
Protokolle des Bösen (2016–present)
Storage Wars (Storage Wars - Die Geschäftemacher) (2014–present)
Surviving Marriage (Surviving Marriage - Ehe auf dem Prüfstand) (2015–present)
The Great Christmas Light Fight (2014–present)
The Haunting of... (Schatten der Vergangenheit) (2014–present)
The Killing Season (2016–present)
The Mind of a Murderer (Interview mit einem Mörder) (2016–present)
Wahlburgers (2014–present)

Audience share

Germany

References

External links
 

A&E Networks
Television stations in Germany
Television stations in Austria
Television stations in Switzerland
German-language television stations
Television channels and stations established in 2014
2014 establishments in Germany
Mass media in Munich